Deng Zewen (born 6 February 1997) is a Chinese water polo player. She competed in the 2020 Summer Olympics.

References

1997 births
Living people
Water polo players at the 2020 Summer Olympics
Chinese female water polo players
Olympic water polo players of China
21st-century Chinese women